Esther Barrugués Alviñá (born 16 May 1980) is an Andorran sports shooter. She competed in the women's 10 metre air rifle event at the 2016 Summer Olympics where she finished in 51st place.

References

External links
 

1980 births
Living people
Andorran female sport shooters
Olympic shooters of Andorra
Shooters at the 2016 Summer Olympics
Competitors at the 2018 Mediterranean Games
Place of birth missing (living people)
European Games competitors for Andorra
Shooters at the 2015 European Games
Mediterranean Games competitors for Andorra